Extra Magazine is an Italian weekly magazine of news, politics and culture. The magazine was established by Rosa Colucci and Francesco Mastrovito in 2006. The headquarters is in Taranto.

References

External links
 Official website

2006 establishments in Italy
Italian-language magazines
Magazines established in 2006
News magazines published in Italy
Weekly magazines published in Italy